Sybil Audrey Marie Lupp (née Colley; 1 August 1916 – 26 December 1994) was a New Zealand mechanic, motor-racing driver, garage proprietor and motor vehicle dealer. She was born in Clive, Hawke's Bay, New Zealand on 1 August 1916.

Lupp was awarded the New Zealand 1990 Commemoration Medal and, in 1993, the New Zealand Suffrage Centennial Medal.

References

1916 births
1994 deaths
Sportspeople from the Hawke's Bay Region
New Zealand racing drivers
Recipients of the New Zealand Suffrage Centennial Medal 1993